The 11th Nuestra Belleza México pageant, was held at the Teatro Tangamanga of San Luis Potosí, San Luis Potosí, Mexico September 11, 2004. Twenty-five contestants of the Mexican Republic competed for the national title, which was won by Laura Elizondo from Tamaulipas, who later competed in Miss Universe 2005 in Thailand where she was the 3rd Runner-up. Elizondo was crowned by outgoing Nuestra Belleza México titleholder Rosalva Luna. She was the second Tamaulipeca and the first red hair to win this title.

The Nuestra Belleza Mundo México title was won by Dafne Molina from Distrito Federal, who later competed in Miss World 2005 in China where she was the 1st Runner-up. Molina was crowned by outgoing Nuestra Belleza Mundo México titleholder Yessica Ramírez. She was the second Capitalina to win this Title.

This year reinforces the concept of Comprehensive Women which promotes Nuestra Belleza México to establish five special awards: Miss Top Model, Miss Talent, Miss Internet (after Contestants' Choice), Miss Sports and Academic Award during the preliminary round. The winners of special awards automatically go to semifinals.

The recognition "Corona al Mérito 2004" was for Vanessa Guzmán, Nuestra Belleza México 1995, Finalist in Miss Universe 1996, Señorita América Internacional 1996 and actress.

Results

Placements

Order of announcements

Top 10
Chihuahua
Coahuila
Michoacán
Nuevo León
Tamaulipas
Guerrero
San Luis Potosí
Distrito Federal
Jalisco
Veracruz

Top 5
Coahuila
Distrito Federal
Nuevo León
Tamaulipas
Morelos

Preliminary Competition
For the second consecutive time, the Preliminary Competition was held at the "Hoy" TV Show on September 8th, 2004. Prior to the final telecast, all contestants competed in swimsuit during the preliminary competition, included corporal expression category.  

In this program were chosen the Top 20 among the 25 candidates. Only the top 20 participated in the final night. The Preliminary Competition was hosted by Andrea Legarreta and Ernesto Laguardia.

Order of announcements
In addition, the names of the semifinalists who would compete on the final night they met.

Chihuahua
San Luis Potosí
Nuevo León
Distrito Federal
Sinaloa
Guanajuato
Campeche
Michoacán
Jalisco
Baja California

Baja California Sur
Nayarit
Jalisco
Veracruz
Durango
Guerrero
Sonora
Tamaulipas
Coahuila
Campeche

Special awards

Judges

Preliminary Competition
Anna Fusoni - Fashion Manager
Blanca Estela Sánchez - Fashion Designer
Elvia Zárate - Psychologist
Fefi Mauri - Director of Modeling Agency
Sarah Bustani - Fashion Designer
Vanessa Guzmán - Nuestra Belleza México 1995 and Actress
Adriana César - Jury Coordinator of Nuestra Belleza México

Final Competition
Lloyd Phillips - Producer
Adrián Sánchez - Designer Fashion
Anna Roth - Production Manager
Carlos Latapi - Photographer
Mario de la Reguera - Entertainment Journalist
Liliana Abud - Writer
Reynaldo López - Producer
Pilar Miranda - Fuller Manager
Pedro Damián - Producer
Sergio Mayer - Actor

Background music
Aleks Syntek
Luis Fonsi

Contestants

Designates
 - María Beatríz Ortegón
 - Gabriela Vázquez
- Alexia Vázquez

Returning states
Last competed in 2002:

Withdrawals

 Estado de México

Significance
Tamaulipas won the Nuestra Belleza México title for second time, (before 1996).
Disrito Federal won the Nuestra Belleza Mundo México title for second time, (before 1999).
Nuevo León was the Suplente/1st Runner-up for the second time, (before 2003).
For the second time a Titleholder resigned to the title (María Esther Molina, Nuestra Belleza Yucatán 2004).
This was the edition with less participants, 25.
For the first time Morelos and Tlaxcala retires from competition.
Campeche, Coahuila and San Luis Potosí return to competition after two years (2002).
Chiahuahua placed for seventh consecutive year.
Tamaulipas placed for sixth consecutive year.
Distrito Federal, Jalisco, Michoacán and Nuevo León placed for second consecutive year.
Guerrero returned to making calls to the semifinals after nine years (1995), San Luis Potosí after four years (2000) and Coahuila and  Veracruz after two years (2002).
States that were called to the semifinals last year and this year failed to qualify were Aguascalientes, Baja California, Durango, Guanajuato, Puebla, Sinaloa and Sonora.
For second consecutive time Ernesto Laguardia hosted Nuestra Belleza México and for the first time with Silvia Salgado.
Distrito Federal won Miss Top Model for the first time.
Sinaloa won Miss Internet for the first time.
Nuevo León won Academic Award for the first time.
San Luis Potosí won Miss Talent for the first time.
Chihuahua won Miss Sports for the first time.
Veracruz won Miss Photogenic for the first time.
Sonora won Miss Congeniality for the first time.
Distrito Federal won the Best Hair Award for the first time.
Tamaulipas won Fuller Beauty Queen Award for the first time.
Yucatán won the Best National Costume award for second time (before 2001).
The host delegate, Ana Sofía Escobosa from San Luis Potosí, placed to semifinals.
Jalisco (Gabriela Vázquez) is the higher delegate in this edition (1.83 m).
Veracruz (Melina Rivera) is the lower delegate in this edition (1.68 m).

Contestants notes
 - Samantha Juárez Rodríguez is the sister of Diana Juárez Rodríguez, Nuestra Belleza Campeche 2002
 Distrito Federal - Dafne Molina prior to becoming a beauty queen participated in Elite Model Look Mexico 2002 and later received her diploma in interior design. She obtained the title of Nuestra Belleza Mundo México, which gave her the right to represent Mexico in Miss World 2005 held at the Crown of Beauty Theatre in Sanya, People's Republic of China on December 10, 2005. There, Molina placed as the first runner-up and obtained the title of Miss World Americas 2005. She also placed third in the Beach Beauty contest. She is a professional model and TV hostess.
 . Priscila Avellaneda studied at the CEA of Televisa, she has participated in several soap operas, also in theatre and cinema.
 - Ana Paola de la Parra born in Ensenada, Baja California and she has a twin sister. She came to live in Nuevo Leon in 2002, there were some disappointments in the State tournament since she was from another state, but to have two years of residence, it was agreed that she did not commit any failure to continue with the title state as Nuestra Belleza Nuevo León 2004, reaching placed as 1st Runner-up in the National Competition.
 - Vanessa Polo found herself involved in a scandal with the police in Mexico City in August 2011 after being verbally abusive to the authorities, she won the nickname "Ladie de Polanco".
 - Sofía Escobosa is TV hostess in several TV programs.
 - Laura Elizondo obtained the title of Nuestra Belleza México, which gave her the right to represent Mexico at Miss Universe 2005 held at the Impact Arena in Bangkok, Thailand on May 31, 2005. There, she placed as the third runner-up. She also placed third in Best National Costume. Elizondo stated that although she didn't win, she was satisfied with the results as well as her accomplishments within the competition. She graduated on May 30, 2008 from Tecnológico de Monterrey with a Bachelor of Business Administration. She is married to businessman Hugo Alanís in Monterrey.
 - María Esther Molina resigned the Nuestra Belleza Yucatán title because she married before the end of her reign.

Crossovers

Contestants who had competed or will compete at other beauty pageants:

Miss Universe
 2005: : Laura Elizondo (3rd Runner-up)

Miss World
 2005:  Distrito Federal: Dafne Molina (1st Runner-up)

References

External links
Official Website

.México
2004 in Mexico
2004 beauty pageants